Chaetacanthus is a genus of polychaetes belonging to the family Polynoidae.

The species of this genus are found in America.

Species:

Chaetacanthus barbatus 
Chaetacanthus brasiliensis 
Chaetacanthus harrisae 
Chaetacanthus magnificus 
Chaetacanthus ornatus 
Chaetacanthus pilosus 
Chaetacanthus pomareae

References

Polychaetes